San Jose language may refer to:

Tamyen language (California)
Guamo language (Venezuela)